The December 2011 Syrian-Turkey border clash was an unsuccessful attempt by armed men to infiltrate into Syria from Turkey.

During the night of 5 December, about 35 armed fighters tried to cross the border of Syria from Turkey but were engaged immediately by the Syrian borders forces who inflicted several wounds to them and were able to repel them back to Turkey.

Once they were back on Turkish soil, the Turkish army picked them up in trucks and took care of the injured fighters.

A further attempt happened, as during the night of 12 December, 15 infiltrators tried again to cross the borders. They were unsuccessful and two of them were killed by Syrian border patrols.

Because of this, the pro-government Syrian news agency, SANA, stated that the Free Syrian Army staged a retaliation attack and shot and killed a senior officer, Brigadier General Ghanem Ibrahim al-Hassan.

On 1 February, Syrian authorities announced that they prevented another infiltration attempt from Turkey, in the Idlib Province. One infiltrator was killed and another arrested while the others fled. On 10 March a new group of infiltrators was prevented from moving into Syria with several members of the group killed or arrested by the army.

References

Military operations of the Syrian civil war in 2011
2011 in Turkey
December 2011 clash
Military operations of the Syrian civil war involving the Syrian government
Military operations of the Syrian civil war involving the Free Syrian Army
December 2011 events in Syria
December 2011 events in Turkey